Iftikhar Ahmed may refer to:

 Iftikhar Ahmed (cricketer), Pakistani international cricketer
 Iftikhar Ahmed (Faisalabad cricketer), Pakistani cricketer
 Iftikhar Ahmad (journalist) (born 1950), Pakistani research journalist
 Iftikhar Ahmad (barrister) (born 1949), Pakistani barrister, political activist and former military officer
 Iftikhar Ahmed (politician) (born 1954), Pakistani politician